Break the Cycle is the third studio album by American rock band Staind, released through Elektra Entertainment and Flip Records in 2001. It is Staind's most successful album to date and was the album that broke them into the mainstream. It was a huge international success for the band, as it spent three weeks at number-one position in the U.S. album charts and many weeks in the top-10 album charts of the Billboard 200, the UK and New Zealand. It sold at least 4 million copies in 2001. The album was certified 5× platinum by the RIAA.

Background
A total of five singles were released from this album—"It's Been Awhile", "Fade", "Outside", "For You" and "Epiphany"—all of which did incredibly well. There were videos made for each of these songs (some of which can be found on Staind's MTV Unplugged DVD). The first four singles had varying degrees of success in the UK, "It's Been Awhile" charting the highest of the four released in both countries. The album also includes a track called "Waste", dedicated to a teenage fan who committed suicide. Like Staind's previous album, Dysfunction, Break the Cycle has alternative metal/nu metal sounds. However, the album also shows the band's softer post-grunge sound, an element that the band wished to progress further with more acoustic and soft ballad tracks. This included an acoustic rendition of the entire album as a second disc, but this was not finalized.

There is also a bonus track on the album. In the United States, the bonus track is an acoustic version of "It's Been Awhile". However, on the Australian and European editions, the bonus track is a live acoustic version of "Outside", performed with Fred Durst in Biloxi, Mississippi, on the Family Values Tour 1999.

Sales

Because of the record's high recording budget of $800,000, there were many worries about whether the album would be successful, and the album almost had to top charts internationally just to break even with studio costs. Break the Cycle debuted at number one on the Billboard 200, with first-week sales of at least 717,600 copies. It remained at the top the following week, with 329,299 copies. In the third week it was number one again, with 244,698 copies. In the fourth week it dropped to number two, with 221,179 copies. It sold over 1 million copies in the first three weeks. The album sold 4,900,000 copies in the US and was certified 5× platinum by the RIAA. Break the Cycle also topped charts in the UK, where it was certified platinum; in New Zealand; and in Canada, where it had multiplatinum status. In 2001 the album was the tenth best-selling globally, selling 5.6 million copies

Reception

Initial critical response ranged from mixed to average. At Metacritic, which assigns a normalized rating out of 100 to reviews from mainstream critics, the album has received an average score of 55, based on nine reviews.

Track listing
All lyrics written by Aaron Lewis, all music by Staind, except where noted.

Personnel 

Staind
Aaron Lewis – lead vocals, rhythm guitar
Mike Mushok – lead guitar
Johnny April – bass, backing vocals
Jon Wysocki – drums

Additional musicians
Fred Durst – additional backing vocals on "Outside" 
Mike Kezner – sitar on "Warm Safe Place"

Artwork
Craig Howell – art direction, illustration
Gayle Boulware – art direction
Clay Patrick McBride – photography
John Baptiste – styling

Production
Josh Abraham – producer
 Fred Durst – A&R
 DJ Lethal – A&R
Peter Katsis – A&R coordination
Cailin McCarthy – A&R coordination assistant
 Joseph Bogan  – assistant engineers
 Paul Conaway – assistant engineers
Steve Sisco – assistant mixing engineer
Jordan Schur – executive producer
Vlado Meller – mastering
Andy Wallace – mixing
 Dave Dominguez – recording

Management
The Firm – Exclusive management
David Mantel – Legal representation
Stuart A. Ditsky – Business management

Charts

Weekly charts

Year-end charts

Decade-end charts

Certifications

References

Staind albums
2001 albums
Albums produced by Josh Abraham
Flip Records (1994) albums
Elektra Records albums
Albums recorded at Electric Lady Studios